Areza Subregion is a subregion in the Debub (Southern) region of Eritrea. Its capital lies at Areza.

References

Awate.com: Martyr Statistics

Southern Region (Eritrea)
Subregions of Eritrea